David Kwang-shin Kim (born 1935 – May 25, 2022), was a South Korean Protestant Christian pastor. He was the president of Grace Ministries International (GMI) and the former pastor and founder of Grace Korean Church. He was also the principal pastor of Seoul Grace Church.

Life and career

Early life and education 
David Kwang-shin Kim was born in 1935, in Gyeongsangnam-do, South Korea. He graduated from Mason High School and then Seoul National University. After teaching in a high school for 11 years in South Korea, he left for the United States and became a businessman.

Ministry
At the age of 42, Kim became a born-again Christian and abandoned his business, and entered the Talbot School of Theology. He led bible studies as an elder and theology student.

In 1982, he founded Grace Korean Church with only three families instead of the usual bible study members.

In 2000, he launched Grace Ministries International, a missions' organization.

The mission of Grace Korean Church is to obey the Great Commission. It has dispensed more than half of its budget for international mission work.

Mission
Through Grace Ministries International, churches have been planted all over the world—2,000 in Russia, 600 in Africa, 3,000 in China, 1,000 in Vietnam, and many more in South America. GMI sent more than 250 missionaries to about 50 countries. In the United States, Grace Church is considered to be doing the most mission work for an individual local church. More precisely, the size of its mission endeavors is more than double that of the second and third top American church missions put together.

Strategy of mission
Kim and Grace Korean Church together with GMI have prepared different mission strategies according to the region. For example, in Russia, a very concentrated theological school was established in the early stages of GMI's ministry there. In South America, high-level and well-prepared mission schools were needed since 95% of the pastors did not graduate from a theology school and 80% of them only had an elementary education. In Japan, reasoning the truth of the Bible is necessary since the Japanese people will not easily accept a foreign idea if they are not convinced of it. In China, secret mission work on the family level is necessary due to political difficulty.

Glow of Love
Also known as Tres Dias, the contents of this four-nights-and-three-days program are intended to be a surprise for participants, and they are never described in detail by those that have graduated from it because it could spoil their effect. There is a fee to pay which is to cover the expenses. At one time in the United States, more than 2,000 candidates wanted to participate in this program, which cannot hold more than a hundred and fifty candidates. There is more than 10 Glow of Loves prepared by Grace Church all over the world—including France, Germany, Spain, Russia, and its surrounding countries, South Korea, Japan, Taiwan, and Africa.

G12
Grace Korean Church has a special program called “Basket Operation” that is composed of 13 successive steps:
 Oiks Evangelism
 Cell Church
 Central Church
 Grace Encounter (10 weeks)
 1 to 1 Discipleship (16 weeks)
 Tree Dias (3 days, 4 nights)
 Gifts Discovery Seminar (8 weeks)
 Shepard Seminar (8 weeks)
 Grace Freedom
 Shepard / G-7 Member
 G-7 Leader
 Leadership College-1 year and
 Ministry Involvement

External links
Seoul Grace Church
Grace Korean Church in the USA
GMI
GMI English Junior High Ministry (USA)
GMI English High School Ministry (USA)
GMI English Adult Ministry (USA)
David Kwangshin Kim's website

1935 births
People from South Gyeongsang Province
South Korean evangelicals
South Korean Protestant ministers and clergy